Puchały may refer to the following places:
Puchały, Ostrołęka County in Masovian Voivodeship (east-central Poland)
Puchały, Pruszków County in Masovian Voivodeship (east-central Poland)
Puchały, Podlaskie Voivodeship (north-east Poland)